Pinon and Hadi are the Chakma traditional dress for women. Pinon refers to the lower part of the dress that is being wrap around the women hip like a skirt and the Hadi is used for the upper part of the women.

The origin of Pinon Hadi comes from Tipra Rinai Risha. Phatung/Fatung rinai risha was adopted by the people of chakma.

See also 
Chakma people

References 

Bangladeshi clothing